The Modern Pentathlon competition at the 2010 Central American and Caribbean Games was held in Mayagüez, Puerto Rico.

The tournament was scheduled to be held from 29 to 30 July at the Guatemala City in Guatemala.

Medal summary

External links

Events at the 2010 Central American and Caribbean Games
Central American and Caribbean Games
2010